Luis Alberto Ordiales Meana (born 15 January 1952) is a Spanish former road cyclist. He most notably won a stage of the 1977 Vuelta a España.

Major results

1975
 2nd GP Villafranca de Ordizia
1976
 1st Gran Premio de Llodio
 1st Stage 5 Vuelta Asturias
 1st Stage 5a Vuelta a Aragón
 2nd Gran Premio de Valencia
1977
 1st Stage 17 Vuelta a España
 1st Stage 2 Vuelta a los Valles Mineros
 2nd GP Viscaya
 9th Overall Vuelta a Cantabria
1st Stages 1 & 4a
1978
 1st Overall Vuelta a Segovia
1st Stage 3
 1st Stage 2 Vuelta a La Rioja
 1st Stage 4a Vuelta a Cantabria
 2nd Road race, National Road Championships
 3rd Memorial Francisco Ferrer
1979
 1st Stage 5a Vuelta Asturias
 2nd Memorial Francisco Ferrer

References

External links

1952 births
Living people
Spanish male cyclists
Spanish Vuelta a España stage winners
Sportspeople from Oviedo
Cyclists from Asturias